Gongylonema is a genus of thread-like nematode that was described by Molin in 1857. It is the only currently valid genus in the family Gongylonematidae, though the mysterious Spiruroides – usually placed in the Subuluridae, which are not closely related to Gongylonema among the Spiruria – might actually belong here. They are parasites of birds and mammals, transmitted by insects (especially beetles). Some 38 species are known, about 12 of which have been recorded in Europe.

Several species are significant parasites of domestic animals, causing gongylonemiasis. Human infection by these nematodes is very rare: since its discovery fewer than 100 people have been reported to be infected with these parasites, always with the species G. pulchrum.

Species

 Gongylonema aegypti Ashour & Lewis, 1986
 Gongylonema aequispicularis Kadenazii, 1957
 Gongylonema alecturae Johnston & Mawson, 1942
 Gongylonema baylisi Freitas & Lent, 1937
 Gongylonema beveridgei Mawson, 1971
 Gongylonema brevispiculum Seurat, 1914 
 Gongylonema caucasica Kurashvili, 1941
 Gongylonema confusum Sonsino, 1896
 Gongylonema congolense Fain, 1955
 Gongylonema dipodomysi Kruidenier & Peebles, 1958
 Gongylonema dupuisi Quentin, 1965
 Gongylonema fotedari Gupta & Trivedi, 1986
 Gongylonema graberi Barre, 1980
 Gongylonema ingluvicola Ransom, 1904
 Gongylonema longispiculum Schulz, 1927
 Gongylonema macrogubernaculum Lubimov, 1931
 Gongylonema madeleinensis Diouf, Bâ, Marchand & Vassiliadès, 1997
 Gongylonema marsupialis Vaz & Pereira, 1934
 Gongylonema mesasiatica Sultanov, 1961
 Gongylonema metopidiusi Gupta & Kumar, 1977
 Gongylonema mexicanum Caballero & Zerecero, 1944
 Gongylonema minimum Molin, 1857
 Gongylonema monnigi
 Gongylonema mucronatum Seurat, 1916
 Gongylonema musculi Rudolphi, 1819
 Gongylonema neoplasticum Fibiger & Ditlevsen, 1914
 Gongylonema pacoi Hernandez & Gutierrez, 1992 
 Gongylonema pithyusensis Mas-Coma, 1977 
 Gongylonema problematicum Schulz, 1924
 Gongylonema pulchrum Molin, 1857
 Gongylonema rodhaini Fain, 1948
 Gongylonema saimirisi Artigas, 1933
 Gongylonema soricis Fain, 1955
 Gongylonema spalacis Schulz, 1927
 Gongylonema verrucosum Giles, 1892

References 

Spirurida
Parasitic nematodes of vertebrates
Secernentea genera